Kenji Ishihara (28 February 1895 – 11 July 1984) was a Japanese architect. His work was part of the architecture event in the art competition at the 1932 Summer Olympics.

References

1895 births
1984 deaths
20th-century Japanese architects
Olympic competitors in art competitions
People from Hyōgo Prefecture